SpaceX COTS Demo Flight 1 was the first orbital spaceflight of the Dragon cargo spacecraft, and the second overall flight of the Falcon 9 rocket manufactured by SpaceX. It was also the first demonstration flight for NASA's Commercial Orbital Transportation Services (COTS) program. The primary mission objectives were to test the orbital maneuvering and reentry of the Dragon capsule. The mission also aimed to test fixes to the Falcon 9 rocket, particularly the unplanned roll of the first stage that occurred during flight 1. Liftoff occurred on 8 December 2010 at 15:43 UTC.

The success of the mission allowed SpaceX to advance its vehicle testing plan. With two back-to-back "near-perfect" Falcon 9 launches and satisfactory tests of the first Dragon capsule, SpaceX "asked NASA to combine objectives laid out for the remaining two COTS missions... and permit a berthing at the ISS during its next flight". This combined test mission was completed in May 2012, and achieved its objectives, opening the path to regular cargo deliveries by Dragon to the International Space Station (ISS) under the Commercial Resupply Services (CRS) contract. Commercial flights started in October 2012 with CRS-1.

COTS contract 
On 18 August 2006, NASA announced that SpaceX had won a NASA Commercial Orbital Transportation Services (COTS) contract to demonstrate cargo delivery to the International Space Station with a possible option for crew transport. This contract, designed by NASA to provide "seed money" for development of new boosters, paid SpaceX $278 million to develop the Falcon 9 launch vehicle, with incentive payments paid at milestones culminating in three demonstration launches. COTS Demo Flight 1 was the first of the launches under this contract. The original agreement with NASA called for the COTS Demo Flight 1 to occur in the second quarter of 2008; this flight was delayed several times, actually occurring in December 2010.

Separately from the NASA COTS contract, SpaceX was also awarded a NASA contract for commercial resupply services (CRS) to the ISS. The firm contracted value is $1.6 billion, and NASA could elect to order additional missions for a total contract value of up to $3.1 billion.

Preparations 

The two stages and Dragon capsule for the second Falcon 9 were built at SpaceX's manufacturing facility at Hawthorne, California, and were delivered to SpaceX's facilities at Cape Canaveral in July and August 2010.

The target launch date was rescheduled from its original 2008 date to the end of 2010, with COTS Demo 2 and 3 being rescheduled to 2011.

A full wet dress rehearsal was conducted on 15 September 2010, and the launch was targeted for no earlier than 7 December 2010.

On 22 November 2010, SpaceX announced that it had received a license for spacecraft re-entry from the Federal Aviation Administration's Office of Commercial Space Transportation for the flight. It is the first such license issued to a private enterprise.

A successful static test fire was performed by SpaceX on 4 December 2010. This was the third attempt to do so, as the first two attempts were automatically aborted. The first attempt was on 3 December 2010, but the test was automatically aborted one second before ignition due to a high-pressure reading.

The flight was to proceed on 7 December 2010. However, several cracks were noted on the outer portions of the niobium extension of the second stage Merlin vacuum nozzle. The decision was made to trim the un-needed six inches off the nozzle, since the resulting performance loss was not critical.

Launch events 
The launch was ultimately scheduled for 8 December 2010, with launch windows available from 14:00 to 14:06, 15:38 to 15:43, and 17:16 to 17:24 UTC based on the availability of the NASA tracking and data relay satellite (TDRS) network used to track and communicate with the spacecraft. The first attempt was originally scheduled for the middle of the first launch window, at 14:03 UTC, but was moved to the end of the window at 14:06 UTC. This attempt was aborted at T-02:48 on the countdown clock because of false telemetry data.

The launch was re-targeted for 15:43 UTC, and was successful. First stage engines cut off at T+02:56, nose cone separated at T+03:47, second stage engines cut off at T+08:56, all as planned. These were close to targeted marks of a  circular orbit at an inclination of 34.5°.

Additional payloads 
The Falcon 9 carried a small number of nanosatellites to orbit as well. Included were a total of eight cubesats including the first U.S. Army nanosatellite, Space and Missile Defense Command — Operational Nanosatellite Effect, or SMDC-ONE, for a 30-day mission, and two 3U buses, the CubeSat Experiment (QbX), provided by the U.S. National Reconnaissance Office, also expected to remain in orbit for only 30 days.

One of the weight ballasts inside the Dragon spacecraft was a metal barrel containing a wheel of French Le Brouère cheese. This cheese is produced in Bulgnéville, Vosges. It was packed as a joke, and references the Cheese Shop sketch from Monty Python's Flying Circus. The barrel's lid was pasted with an image from the poster for the 1984 spoof film Top Secret!. SpaceX's CEO did not reveal the identity of the cargo during the post-splashdown news conference, for fear of the joke overshadowing the company's accomplishments.

Orbit and landing

Dragon 

While in orbit, a battery of automated tests were performed including thermal control and attitude control to maintain uninterrupted TDRS data links. At 16:15 UTC, SpaceX announced that it had achieved contact with the Dragon module through the TDRS system. SpaceX reported that all test objectives were completed, and the recovery craft arrived to retrieve the spacecraft within 20 minutes of splashdown. The craft landed within  of the targeted location, well within the  recovery zone. From launch to splashdown, the demonstration flight lasted for 3 hours, 19 minutes, 52 seconds.

Second stage 
The second stage engine was reignited in orbit after separation from the Dragon capsule. This allowed SpaceX to work on a secondary mission objective of expanding the launch capability envelope by testing in-space engine reignition and ability of the vehicle to achieve a beyond-LEO (Low Earth Orbit).

See also 

 List of Falcon 9 launches
 SpaceX COTS Demo Flight 2

References

External links 

 DRAGON C1 – Orbit (Pre-Decay)
 Falcon 9 Rocket Body (Second Stage) – Orbit

SpaceX Dragon
SpaceX payloads contracted by NASA
Spacecraft launched in 2010
Spacecraft which reentered in 2010
Articles containing video clips
Test spaceflights